William Bootle (9 January 1926 – 10 August 2012) was a footballer who played as a winger in the Football League for Manchester City and Crewe Alexandra. He also played for Wigan Athletic in the Lancashire Combination, scoring 31 goals in 76 league appearances.

References

External links
Profile at 11v11.com

1926 births
2012 deaths
English footballers
Manchester City F.C. players
Crewe Alexandra F.C. players
English Football League players
Wigan Athletic F.C. players
Footballers from Ashton-under-Lyne
Association football wingers